Eden House may refer to:

Child and Parent Resource Institute, London, Ontario, Canada
Eden House (Gambia), Brufut, the Gambia
The Eden House, a gothic rock band from the UK
Eden House (play), a 1969 play by Hal Porter